The Lillie and Hugh Roy Cullen Sculpture Garden is a sculpture garden located at the Museum of Fine Arts, Houston (MFAH) in Houston, Texas, United States. Designed by artist and landscape architect Isamu Noguchi, the garden consists of 25 works of the MFAH, including sculptures by Henri Matisse, Alexander Calder, David Smith, Frank Stella, and Louise Bourgeois. There are also sculptures created specifically for the site, including Ellsworth Kelly's Houston Triptych and Tony Cragg's New Forms. The garden also features works by local Texas artists, including Joseph Havel's Exhaling Pearls, Jim Love's Can Johnny Come Out and Play?, and Linda Ridgway's The Dance.

History

In 1969, The Brown Foundation, Inc provided the funds to purchase two city blocks making it feasible for the MFAH to construct a formal sculpture garden. The garden was designed by New York-based artist and landscape architect Isamu Noguchi. In 1978, Houston City Council motion number 78-986 declared the museum to be named The Lillie and Hugh Roy Cullen Sculpture Garden in recognition of Hugh Roy Cullen and Lillie Cullen's contributions to the city's art and medical communities. Construction of the garden began on February 6, 1984, and the garden officially opened to the public on April 5, 1986.

Works

 Antoine Bourdelle, Adam (1889)
 Louise Bourgeois, Quarantania I
 Alexander Calder, The Crab (1962)
 Anthony Caro, Argentine (1968)
 Pietro Consagra, Conversation with the Wind (1962)
 Tony Cragg, New Forms
 Raymond Duchamp-Villon, The Large Horse (1914)
 Lucio Fontana, Concetto Spaziale, Natura, no. 18 and Concetto Spaziale, Natura, no. 28
 Alberto Giacometti, Large Standing Woman I
 DeWitt Godfrey, Untitled (1989)
 Joseph Havel, Exhaling Pearls (1993)
 Bryan Hunt, Arch Falls (1981)
 Bryan Hunt, Big Twist (1978)
 Ellsworth Kelly, Houston Triptych (1986)
 Jim Love, Can Johnny Come Out and Play?
 Aristide Maillol, Flora, Nude
 Marino Marini, The Pilgrim
 Henri Matisse, The Back Series (Back I, Back II, Back III, Back IV)
 Joan Miró, Bird
 Mimmo Paladino, The Sound of Night 
 Linda Ridgway, The Dance (2000)
 Auguste Rodin, Cybele
 Auguste Rodin, The Spirit of Eternal Repose (1898–1899)
 Auguste Rodin, The Walking Man
 Joel Shapiro, Untitled (1990)
 David Smith, Two Circle Sentinel (1961)
 Frank Stella, Decanter (1987)
 William Tucker, Gymnast II (1985)
 Eduardo Ramírez Villamizar, Recuerdo de Machu Picchu 3 (Las terrazas) (1984)

References

External links

 The Lillie and Hugh Roy Cullen Sculpture Garden

 
1986 establishments in Texas
Art museums established in 1986
Art museums and galleries in Texas
Decorative arts museums in the United States
Museums in Houston
Sculpture gardens, trails and parks in the United States